Marchinko is a surname. Notable people with the surname include:

 Brian Marchinko (1948–2014), Canadian ice hockey player
 Jhoni Marchinko, American television writer

See also
 Marchenko
 Marchino